Cameron Ballantyne (born 13 April 1997) is a Scottish footballer who plays as a defender for Scottish League One club Airdrieonians. Ballantyne previously played for Dundee United and Dumbarton, and had three loan spells with Montrose.

Early life
Cammy Ballantyne was born in Glasgow on 13 April 1997. He attended Duncanrig Secondary School in East Kilbride. After joining Dundee United as a youth player in 2007, he signed for the club as a professional in 2013.

Playing career

Club
Ballantyne made his first team debut against Partick Thistle in a Scottish Premiership match on 10 May 2016. He joined League Two team Montrose on loan in August 2016, with the loan being extended in January 2017 for the rest of the 2016–17 season. In March 2017, Ballantyne extended his Dundee United contract to 2018. He rejoined Montrose on a season-long loan in August 2017. His spell with Montrose was, however, cut short, and he was recalled at the start of January 2018. He then rejoined Montrose on an emergency loan for the remainder of the season in March 2018. Following the end of his contract, he was released by United in May 2018 and joined Scottish League One side Dumbarton in June 2018. After making 32 appearances for Dumbarton, he joined Montrose on a two year permanent deal in May 2019.
In May 2022 Ballantyne signed for Airdrieonians.

International
Ballantyne was given his first call up for the Scotland under-17 squad in March 2014. He was added to the Scotland under-21 squad in March 2017, after Zak Jules withdrew.

Career statistics

References

External links

Living people
1997 births
Scottish footballers
Association football defenders
Dundee United F.C. players
Scottish Professional Football League players
Footballers from Glasgow
Scotland youth international footballers
People educated at Duncanrig Secondary School
Montrose F.C. players
Dumbarton F.C. players
Sportspeople from East Kilbride
Airdrieonians F.C. players